The Yakovlev Yak-3 (Russian: Яковлев Як-3) was a single-engine, single-seat World War II Soviet fighter. Robust and easy to maintain, it was much liked by both pilots and ground crew. One of the smallest and lightest combat fighters fielded by any combatant during the war, its high power-to-weight ratio gave it excellent performance and it proved to be a formidable dogfighter.

Origins
The origins of the Yak-3 went back to 1941 when the I-30 prototype was offered along with the I-26 (Yak-1) as an alternative design. The I-30, powered by a Klimov M-105P engine, was of all-metal construction, using a wing with dihedral on the outer panels. Like the early Yak-1, it had a  ShVAK cannon firing through the hollow-driveshaft nose spinner as a motornaya pushka (моторная пушка - Literally: 'Motor Cannon'), twin  synchronized ShKAS machine guns in cowling mounts and a ShVAK cannon in each wing.

During the Battle of Stalingrad, Luftwaffe fighters exhibited significant speed, climb rate, and armament advantages over those of the VVS. The Yak-1 then in service was understood to be in urgent need of a modernization were it to fight on equal footing against the latest models of German fighters, as well as better energy retention and higher firepower.

Then, in 1943, a group of designers headed by Alexander Sergeyevich Yakovlev designed the Yak-3, a further development of the proven Yak-1 aimed at improving survivability, flight characteristics and firepower, which required a lower weight, a higher-power engine and therefore, faster speed.

Design and development

The first of two prototypes had a slatted wing to improve handling and short-field performance while the second prototype had a wooden wing without slats in order to simplify production and save aluminium. The second prototype crashed during flight tests and was written off. Although there were plans to put the Yak-3 into production, the scarcity of aviation aluminium and the pressure of the Nazi invasion led to work on the first Yak-3 being abandoned in late 1941.

In between 1942 and 1943, Yakovlev built the Yak-1M, a prototype that would ultimately lead to the Yak-3, coupled with the VK-105PF2, the latest iteration of the VK-105 engine family, where "P" indicated support for a motornaya pushka - an autocannon that fires between the engine banks, through the hollow propeller shaft - mounting. It incorporated a wing of similar design but with smaller surface area, and had further aerodynamic refinements, like the new placement of the oil radiator, from the chin to the wing roots (one of the visual differences with the Yak-1, -7, -9). A second Yak-1M (originally meant as a "backup") prototype was constructed later that year, differing from the first aircraft in that it had plywood instead of fabric covering of the rear fuselage, mastless radio antenna, reflector gunsight and improved armour and engine cooling.

After the VK-105PF2 engine received a boost from a manifold pressure of 1050 mmHg to 1100 mmHg, additional tests were needed to determine how it impacted the flight characteristics of the Yak-3.

The chief test pilot for the project Petr Mikhailovich Stefanovskiy was so impressed with the new aircraft that he recommended that it should completely replace the Yak-1 and Yak-7 with only the Yak-9 retained in production for further work with the Klimov VK-107 engine. The new fighter, designated the Yak-3, entered service in 1944, later than the Yak-9 despite the lower designation number, and by mid-1946 4,848 had been built.

The designation Yak-3 was also used for other Yakovlev projects – a proposed but never built, heavy twin-engine fighter and the Yakovlev Yak-7A.

All armament was installed close to the axis of the aircraft with a cannon mounted in the engine "vee" firing through the propeller boss, synchronised machine guns in the fuselage, helping accuracy and leaving wings unloaded.

Operational history

Lighter and smaller than the Yak-9 but powered by the same engine, the Yak-3 was a forgiving, easy-to-handle aircraft loved by both novice and experienced pilots. It was robust, easy to maintain and a highly successful dog-fighter. It was used mostly as a tactical fighter, flying low over battlefields and engaging in dogfights below .

The new aircraft began to reach frontline units during summer 1944. Yak-3 service tests were conducted by 91st IAP of the 2nd Air Army, commanded by Lt Colonel Kovalyov, in June–July 1944. The regiment had the task of gaining air superiority. During 431 sorties, 20 Luftwaffe fighters and three Junkers Ju 87s were shot down while Soviet losses amounted to two Yak-3s shot down. A large dogfight developed on 16 June 1944, when 18 Yak-3s clashed with 24 German aircraft. Soviet Yak-3 fighters shot down 15 German aircraft for the loss of one Yak destroyed and one damaged. The following day, Luftwaffe activity over that section of the front had virtually ceased.
On 17 July 1944, eight Yaks attacked a formation of 60 German aircraft, including escorting fighters. In the ensuing dogfight, the Luftwaffe lost three Ju 87s and four Bf 109Gs, for no loss. The Luftwaffe issued an order to "avoid combat below five thousand metres with Yakovlev fighters lacking an oil cooler intake beneath the nose!" Luftwaffe fighters in combat with the Yak-3 tried to use surprise tactics, attacking from above.

Unresolved wartime problems with the Yak-3 included plywood surfaces delaminating when the aircraft pulled out of a high-speed dive, short-range and poor engine reliability. The pneumatic system for actuating landing gear, flaps and brakes, typical for all Yakovlev fighters of the time, was troublesome. Though less reliable than hydraulic or electrical alternatives, the pneumatic system was preferred owing to the weight saving.

In 1944, the Normandie-Niemen Group re-equipped with the Yak-3, scoring the last 99 of their 273 air victories against the Luftwaffe.

Total Yak-3 losses in combat were 210, 60 in 1944 and 150 in 1945.

Variants

 Yak-3 main production version
After several mixed-construction prototypes, 48 all-metal production aircraft were built in 1945–1946 during and after WW2. Despite excellent performance ( at ), it saw only limited squadron service with the 897th IAP. Though the problems with the VK-107 overheating were eventually mitigated, it was decided to leave the engine for the better-suited Yak-9.
Another Yak-3 with 2 ×  Berezin B-20 cannons was also fitted with the engine with similar results.
 Yak-3K Armed with a  Nudelman-Suranov NS-45 cannon, only a few built because Yak-9K was a better match for the weapon
 Yak-3P Production started after war armed with 3 ×  Berezin B-20 cannon with 120 rounds for the middle cannon and 130 rpg for the side weapons. A total of 596 being built, none of them took part in combat.
 Yak-3PD high-altitude interceptor with Klimov VK-105PD engine and a single  Nudelman-Suranov NS-23 cannon with 60 rounds of ammunition, reached  in testing but did not enter production due to unreliability of the engine.
During the 16 August test flight, the aircraft crashed for unknown reasons, killing the test pilot V.L. Rastorguev. Like all mixed powerplant aircraft of the time, the project was abandoned in favor of turbojet engines.
 Yak-3T tank destroyer version armed with 1 ×  Nudelman N-37 cannon with 25 rounds and 2 ×  Berezin B-20S cannons with 100 rpg. Cockpit was moved  back to compensate for the heavier nose. Engine modifications required to accept the weapons resulted in serious overheating problems which were never fixed and the aircraft did not advance beyond the prototype stage.
 Yak-3T-57 single Yak-3T with a  OKB-16-57 cannon
 Yak-3TK powered by a VK-107A engine, and fitted with an exhaust turbocharger.
Armament of 2 ×  Berezin B-20 cannons with 120 rpg.
 Yak-3UTI two-seat conversion trainer based on Yak-3U powered by Shvetsov ASh-21 radial piston engine. The aircraft became the prototype for the Yak-11.

Operators
 Normandie-Niemen squadron
 Air Force of the Polish Army
 Soviet Air Force
 SFR Yugoslav Air Force
 111th Fighter Aviation Regiment (1944–48)
 113th Fighter Aviation Regiment (1945–48)
 112th Fighter Aviation Regiment (1945–48)
 254th Fighter Aviation Regiment (1944–48)
 83rd Fighter Aviation Regiment (1948–52)
 116th Fighter Aviation Regiment (1948–52)
 185th Mixed Aviation Regiment (1949–52)
 198th Fighter Aviation Regiment (1949–52)
 204th Fighter Aviation Regiment (1949–50)

Modern production Yak fighters

From 1991 to 2002 there were 21 Yakovlev Yak-3, Yak-7 and Yak-9 aircraft produced in the former Soviet Union using the original plans and dies. These aircraft are powered by the American Allison V-1710 or the Pratt & Whitney R-1830 Twin Wasp engine in place of the Klimov V-12s used during the war. Several of these aircraft are airworthy, mostly based in the United States with others in Germany, Australia and New Zealand. Others have been converted to "Yak-3U" status from original Yak-11 trainers for private owners and museums.

Flying a modified modern production Yak-3UPW powered by a Pratt & Whitney R-2000 engine, William Whiteside set an official international speed record for piston-engined aircraft in the under- category on 10 October 2011, reaching  over a  course at the Bonneville Salt Flats in Utah in the United States, greatly exceeding the previous record of  set in 2002 by Jim Wright.

Specifications (Yak-3)

See also

References

Notes

Bibliography
 Bergström, Christer. Bagration to Berlin: The final Air Battle in the East 1944–45. Hersham UK, Classic Publications, 2008. .
 Donald, David and Jon Lake, eds.  Encyclopedia of World Military Aircraft. London: AIRtime Publishing, 1996. .
 Glancey, Jonathan. Spitfire: The Illustrated Biography. London: Atlantic Books, 2006. .
 Gordon, Yefim. Soviet Airpower in World War II. Hinckley UK: Midland / Ian Allan Publishing, 2008. .
 Gordon, Yefim and Dmitri Khazanov. Soviet Combat Aircraft of the Second World War, Volume I: Single-Engined Fighters. Earl Shilton, Leicester, UK: Midland Publishing Ltd., 1998. .
 Green, William. Warplanes of the Second World War, Volume III: Fighters. London: Macdonald & Co. (Publishers) Ltd., 1961 (seventh impression 1973). .
 Green, William and Gordon Swanborough. WW2 Aircraft Fact Files: Soviet Air Force Fighters, Part 2. London: Macdonald and Jane's Publishers Ltd., 1978. .
 Gunston, Bill. Aircraft of World War Two. London: Octopus Books Limited, 1980. .
 Kopenhagen, W., ed. Das große Flugzeug-Typenbuch (in German). Stuggart, Germany: Transpress, 1987. .
 Liss, Witold. The Yak 9 Series (Aircraft in Profile number 185). Leatherhead, Surrey, UK: Profile Publications Ltd., 1967.
 Matricardi, Paolo. Aerei Militari: caccia e ricognitori. (in Italian) Milano: Mondadori Electa S.p.A., 2006. NO ISBN.
 Mellinger, George. Yakovlev Aces of World War 2. Botley, UK: Osprey Publishing Ltd., 2005. .
 Morgan, Hugh. Gli assi Sovietici della Seconda guerra mondiale. Edizioni del Prado/Osprey Aviation, 1999. .
 Morgan, Hugh. Soviet Aces of World War 2. London: Reed International Books Ltd., 1997. .
 Шавров В.Б. История конструкций самолетов в СССР 1938-1950 гг. (3 изд.). Kniga: Машиностроение, 1994 (Shavrov, V.B. Istoriia konstruktskii samoletov v SSSR, 1938-1950 gg.,3rd ed. (History of Aircraft Design in USSR: 1938-1950). Kniga, Russia: Mashinostroenie, 1994. .
 Stapfer, Hans-Heiri. Yak Fighters in Action (Aircraft number 78). Carrollton, Texas: Squadron/Signal Publications, Inc., 1986. .
 Степанец А.Т. Истребители ЯК периода Великой Отечественной войны. Kniga: Машиностроение, 1992. (Stepanets, A.T. Istrebiteli Yak perioda Velikoi Otechestvennoi voiny (Yak Fighters of the Great Patriotic War). Kniga, Russia: Mashinostroenie, 1992. .
 Якубович, Н.В. Як-3. Истребитель «Победа». Москва: ВЭРО Пресс, Яуза, ЭКСМО, 2011. Yakubovich, N.V. Yak-3. Istrebitel’ “Pobeda” (Yak-3. Fighter “Victory”). Moscow, Russia: VERO Press, Yauza, EKSMO, 2011. .

External links

 Yak-3
 Yak Fighters table
 Yak Piston Fighters
 Interview with Yak-3 WWII pilot
 Last remaining Normandie Niemen Yakovlev 3 on static display at Le Bourget Air and Space Museum/Musée de l’air et de l’espace

Yakovlev Yak-03
World War II Soviet fighter aircraft
Yak-003
Low-wing aircraft
Single-engined tractor aircraft
Aircraft first flown in 1941